Richmond Hill may refer to:

Places

Australia
 Richmond Hill, Queensland, a suburb of Charters Towers

Canada
 Richmond Hill, Ontario
 Richmond Hill GO Station, a station in the GO Transit network located in the town
 Richmond Hill (electoral district)
 Richmond Hill (provincial electoral district)

New Zealand
 Richmond Hill, Christchurch, Canterbury, a suburb of Christchurch on the Banks Peninsula

Sri Lanka
Richmond Hill, Galle

United Kingdom
 Richmond Hill, London
 Richmond Hill, Leeds, West Yorkshire
 Richmond Hill, Bournemouth, Dorset

United States
 Richmond Hill, Georgia
 Richmond Hill Road, a major street in Augusta, Georgia
 Richmond Hill explosion, in Indianapolis
 Richmond Hill, Queens, New York City
 Richmond Hill (Manhattan), a colonial estate that served for a time as the headquarters of George Washington
 Richmond Hill (Livingston, New York), listed on the National Register of Historic Places
 Richmond Hill, North Carolina
 Richmond Hill, Virginia

Other
 SS Richmond Hill, a cargo ship built in 1940 for Counties Ship Management Co. Ltd.
 Richmond Hill (television series), a 1988 Australian television soap opera